The Human Development Index (HDI) is a summary measure of average achievement in key dimensions of human development: a long and healthy life, knowledge, and a decent standard of living. It is a standard means of measuring well-being. It is used to distinguish whether the country is a developed, developing, or underdeveloped country, and also to measure the impact of economic policies on quality of life. Countries fall into four broad categories based on their HDI: very high, high, medium, and low human development.

List
The table below presents the latest Human Development Index (HDI) for countries in Latin America as included in a United Nations Development Programme's Human Development Report (released in 2022). Previous HDI values and rankings are retroactively recalculated using the same updated data sets and current methodologies, as presented in Table 2 of the Statistical Annex of the Human Development Report. The HDI rankings and values in the 2021-22 Human Development Report cannot therefore be compared directly to HDI rankings and values published in previous Human Development Reports.

See also
Community of Latin American and Caribbean States
List of countries by Human Development Index
List of countries by Human Development Index by region
List of countries by industrial production growth rate
List of countries by percentage of population living in poverty
List of Latin American and Caribbean countries by GDP growth
List of Latin American and Caribbean countries by GDP (nominal)
List of Latin American and Caribbean countries by GDP (PPP)
List of Latin American countries by population

References

Human Development Index
Human Development Index
Latin America